North Otago in New Zealand covers the area of Otago between Shag Point and the Waitaki River, and extends inland to the west as far as the village of Omarama (which has experienced rapid growth as a developing centre for astronomy and for gliding).

Geography
Prominent rivers include the Shag, the Waianakarua, the Kakanui and the Waitaki. These are separated from the lower, parallel Horse Range by the upper valleys of the Waianakarua and Shag rivers.

The large east-coast town of Oamaru serves as North Otago's main centre.  Other towns and settlements in the region include Alma, Totara, Teschemakers, Reidston, Maheno, Kakanui, Herbert (also known as Otepopo), Waianakarua, Hampden, and Moeraki, all on or close to the coast south of Oamaru. The coastal plain north of Oamaru has the settlements of Hilderthorpe and Pukeuri.

Inland settlements include Weston, Ardgowan, Windsor, Five Forks, Peebles, Papakaio, Duntroon, Kurow (on the south bank of the Waitaki), Omarama, and Otematata.

History and economy
The area aspired to provincial status in the 19th century, but never attained this. Most of its territory belonged to the Waitaki County, and today is officially part of the Waitaki District. Some sense of regional identity survives in support of sport, notably the North Otago rugby team. In recent years the northwestern part of the area, including the towns of Omarama, Otematata, Kurow, and Duntroon have officially become part of Canterbury region, testing this sense of identity and raising the ire of many locals.

The rolling, tussock-clad hill country of North Otago provides the important agricultural base, originally through sheep-farming but now largely superseded by dairy. The generation of hydro-electricity in the Waitaki Valley has also drawn attention to the area (see Project Aqua), and tourism has grown in recent years.

External links
 Benmore Peak Observatory website
 Omarama Gliding Club website
 World Altitude Record Attempt website

Geography of Otago
Canterbury, New Zealand